Aluspah Brewah (born August 24, 1983) is a retired Sierra Leonian international football player. He last played as a striker for Hanoi F.C. in the Vietnamese Super League and also played for the Sierra Leone national football team.

Early career
At a young age of 14 years he was a member of the Sierra Leone Athletics team. He played with Ajax Academy in Ghana and Ashanti Gold SC West Africa before departing for Europe at the age of 17 years for Royal Antwerp FC of the Jupiler League.

Professional play
After playing in the Jupiler League for almost three seasons, Brewah moved to Flamengo in Brazil's Campeonato Brasileiro League. He stayed there for just one season, moving next to Sweden with Hammarby IF Allsvenskan.

He next went back to Brazil's  Campeonato Brasileiro League to play for Fortaleza EC where he sign for only one season.  He was given the option to extend his term, but choose to go to the Russian Premier League with FC Mashuk-KMV Pyatigorsk for one season. Next he returned to Sweden to play for Assyriska FF.

Brewah joined Jiangsu Sainty on a free transfer in July 2010.

He made 3 appearances for the Sierra Leone national football team.

References

External links
Svenskfotboll profile 
birosca.weblogger.terra.com.br
aftonbladet.se 
african-players.com

flamengo.com.br
pt.euronews.net
worldfootball.net
soccernet.espn.go.com

1983 births
Sierra Leonean footballers
Association football forwards
Living people
People from Bo, Sierra Leone
Hammarby Fotboll players
Royal Antwerp F.C. players
R. Charleroi S.C. players
Bodens BK players
Jiangsu F.C. players
Tianjin Tianhai F.C. players
Chinese Super League players
China League One players
CR Flamengo footballers
Expatriate footballers in Brazil
Expatriate footballers in Ghana
Expatriate footballers in China
Expatriate footballers in Sweden
Expatriate footballers in Russia
Belgian Pro League players
Allsvenskan players
Campeonato Brasileiro Série A players
Sierra Leone international footballers
FC Mashuk-KMV Pyatigorsk players